Lagansky (masculine), Laganskaya (feminine), or Laganskoye (neuter) may refer to:
Lagansky District, a district of the Republic of Kalmykia, Russia
Laganskoye Urban Settlement, a municipal formation which the Town of Lagan in Lagansky District of the Republic of Kalmykia, Russia is incorporated as